This is a list of fictional canines in literature and is subsidiary to the list of fictional canines. It is a collection of various notable non-dog canine characters. Dogs can be found under literature in the list of fictional dogs. Wolves can be found under literature in the list of fictional wolves.

Coyotes

Foxes

Jackals

References

Literature
Canines